Rear Admiral Barrie Lawson West,  (born 11 January 1934) is a retired senior supply officer in the Royal Australian Navy (RAN).

Naval career
West joined the RAN as a midshipman in 1952. He trained in Australia and the United Kingdom, then served in the Korean War and the Malaysian Confrontation.

In 1968, he became an exchange officer with the United States Navy for three years.

On his return to Australia, West spent 12 years in Canberra, Australian Capital Territory, at the Navy Headquarters, including postings as:
 Secretary to the Chief of Naval Staff (as a captain)
 Deputy Chief of Naval Materiel (as commodore)

In 1984, West undertook studies at the Royal College of Defence Studies at Belgravia, London.

West was promoted to rear admiral on 10 May 1985 and appointed as Chief of Naval Materiel, on the retirement of Rear Admiral Bill Rourke. He retired from the Royal Australian Navy in 1989.

Awards
West was made an Officer of the Order of Australia (Military Division) in the 1988 Australia Day Honours for services to the navy as Chief of Naval Materiel. He is also entitled to wear the National Medal with clasp.

References

1934 births
Australian military personnel of the Indonesia–Malaysia confrontation
Australian military personnel of the Korean War
Living people
New Zealand emigrants to Australia
Officers of the Order of Australia
People from Christchurch
Royal Australian Navy admirals
Graduates of the Royal College of Defence Studies
Military personnel from Christchurch